Jack Ernest Shalom Hayward FBA (18 August 1931 – 8 December 2017) was an English writer and academic.

Until his death, he was the Professor of Politics at the University of Hull.

Published works

References

1931 births
2017 deaths
Alumni of the London School of Economics
British political scientists
Academics of the University of Hull
Chevaliers of the Légion d'honneur
Fellows of St Antony's College, Oxford
Fellows of the British Academy